Town on Trial is a 1957 British mystery film directed by John Guillermin and starring John Mills, Charles Coburn, Barbara Bates and Derek Farr. A whole town comes under suspicion when two grisly murders are carried out—particularly members of the local sports club.

Plot
While playing tennis at a posh club in a town near London called Oakley Park, young and flirty Molly Stevens attracts considerable interest. The men ogle her and the women detest her. She is later found dead, strangled with a stocking. The local police chief requests the help of Scotland Yard, so Detective Superintendent Mike Halloran is sent to investigate. The locals, however, resent having an outsider poking into their affairs.

A book of love poems, including an inscription from a Peter Crowley, is found in the victim's flat. There is also a photo of a group of men together with Molly and Fiona Dixon, a young woman from the prominent Dixon family. Her father, although shocked to learn that his daughter knew the "trashy" Molly, will not let Halloran question her.

Halloran eventually learns that Molly left Peter Crowley for a married man, Mark Roper, who is the club's secretary. Roper denies any involvement, and also claims that he was giving nurse Elizabeth Fenner a lift to the hospital at the time of the murder.

The coroner reveals Molly was two months pregnant. Dr. John Fenner, the local Canadian expat physician who certified the death, is asked by Halloran why he neglected to report that fact. Fenner claims he was trying to avoid a scandal for Roper and the club.

Elizabeth turns out to be the doctor's niece and also a Canadian expat. She confirms that Roper gave her a lift, but this later turns out to be a lie - a result of her attempts to protect the reputation of her uncle, who left his practice in Toronto after a misdiagnosis led to a patient's death. This is something the locals are unaware of, but Roper knows and is using this secret to blackmail the doctor.

Roper, always bragging about his wartime heroics as a RAF fighter pilot, is revealed by Halloran to have been nothing but a lowly ground crew member, who was dishonourably discharged after theft and is currently heavily in debt. The club demands Roper's resignation. He turns up at a party, gets drunk and starts a fight. Leaving the party and going for a walk, Fiona is ambushed and strangled to death. Her body is placed in the trunk of Dr. Fenner's car.

Halloran finds out that Peter Crowley has been treated for schizophrenia. Peter flees to a church, climbing to the top of the steeple and threatening to jump. Halloran ascends the steeple to prevent the suicide, risking his own life in the process, and manages to convince Peter not to kill himself. A fire brigade turntable ladder rescues the two just as they are about to fall.

Main cast

 John Mills as Superintendent Mike Halloran
 Charles Coburn as Dr. John Fenner
 Barbara Bates as Elizabeth Fenner 
 Derek Farr as Mark Roper 
 Alec McCowen as Peter Crowley 
 Fay Compton as Mrs. Crowley
 Elizabeth Seal as Fiona Dixon 
 Geoffrey Keen as Charles Dixon 
 Margaretta Scott as Helen Dixon 
 Meredith Edwards as Sergeant Rogers 
 Harry Locke as Sergeant Beale 
 Raymond Huntley as Dr. Reese, pathologist
 Harry Fowler as Bandleader
 Maureen Connell as Mary Roper
 Magda Miller as Molly Stevens
 Newton Blick as Assistant Commissioner Beckett 
 Oscar Quitak as David 
 Totti Truman Taylor
 Grace Arnold
 Dandy Nichols as Mrs. Wilson (uncredited)

Production
The film was based on an original script by Robert Westerby called The Nylon Web. In May 1956 it was announced the film would be a co production between Marksman (the company of Maxwell Setton) and Todon (the company of Donna Reed and her husband). John Guillermin would direct.

In July it was reported that Michael Rennie would star. However the lead roles went to John Mills and Charles Coburn.  Filming began 8 August 1956. That month the title was changed to Town on Trial.

Ella Raines was to play a key role but had to drop out due to her mother's illness. She was replaced by Barbara Bates then under contract to the Rank Organisation.

Reception
The Los Angeles Times said Guillermin "directs this picture at a furious pace."

According to the BFI, "Detractors have too often accused Guillermin of being merely a journeyman, lacking any real style of his own. The defence would do worse than to offer Town on Trial as its Exhibit A, drawing particular attention to its breathtaking PoV shot of the killer stalking a second victim that anticipates the camera gymnastics of Dario Argento."

A profile on John Guillermin called the film "a police procedural in which the lead investigator, in true Guillermin fashion, tears a community to pieces to expose every last lie. Imagine an English Mike Hammer, finding corruption wherever he goes, but too serious and proper to mix it up with the dames and too civic-minded to go ahead and torch the whole town."

Ken Hughes wrote the script. Filmink said "men driven by lust was a recurring theme of Hughes movies". A piece in the same magazine on Guillermin called the film "a little gem, a good, tough British crime film with no cosiness, a lot of pace, plenty of flourishes and energy in the direction."

References

External links
 
 
 
 

Films directed by John Guillermin
1957 films
British mystery films
Films set in England
Columbia Pictures films
1950s English-language films
1950s British films